Elizabeth Morris (or variants) may refer to:

Actresses
Libby Morris, Canadian actress
Beth Morris, British actress
Liz Morris (actress) in Jaws 3-D

Others
Elisabeth Ljunggren-Morris, swimmer
Elisabeth Hirsch/Morris, married name Elizabeth Morris, writer and publisher
Elizabeth Walker Morris (died 1826), English-born American stage actress
Elizabeth Morris, glaciologist
Elizabeth Morris, musician in Allo Darlin'
Betty Morris, fictional character in The Bradshaws